Anaerosolibacter is a Gram-negative, strictly anaerobic, rod-shaped, mesophilic and motile bacterial genus from the family of Clostridiaceae with one known species (Anaerosolibacter carboniphilus).

References

Clostridiaceae
Bacteria genera
Monotypic bacteria genera
Taxa described in 2015